Sıla Çağlar (born 26 February 2004) is a Turkish Women International Master (WIM) (2020).

Biography
In 2013, Sıla Çağlar won European School Chess Championship in the girls U09 age group.  In 2016, she won Turkish Youth Chess Championship n the girls U12 age group. Sila Caglar repeatedly represented Turkey at the European Youth Chess Championships and World Youth Chess Championships in different age groups. In 2016, in Prague she won European Youth Chess Championship in the girls U12 age group and received Women FIDE Master (WFM) title. Sıla Çağlar two times played for Turkey team in the European Girls' U18 Team Chess Championships (2016-2017). Also she participated in European Individual Women Chess Championships (2017, 2018, 2019).

In 2020, she was awarded the FIDE Women International Master (WIM) title.

References

External links

Sila Caglar chess games at 365chess.com

2004 births
Living people
Turkish female chess players
Chess Woman International Masters